The 2018 season was the New England Patriots' 49th in the National Football League (NFL), their 59th overall and their 19th under head coach Bill Belichick. The Patriots entered the season as two-time defending AFC champions.

The Patriots' losses to the Jacksonville Jaguars and Detroit Lions in Week 2 and 3 marked the franchise's first back-to-back double-digit losses since 2002. After this slow 1–2 start, the Patriots improved to 7–2 after Week 9. Following a notable Week 14 loss to the Miami Dolphins, the Patriots could not match their 13–3 record from 2017. A defeat to the Pittsburgh Steelers in Week 15 meant the Patriots had lost five games for the first time since 2009. After a win over the Buffalo Bills in Week 16, the Patriots clinched the AFC East for the tenth consecutive season, surpassing the Dallas Cowboys (1975–1983) and the Indianapolis Colts (2002–2010) for the most consecutive playoff appearances. New England went undefeated at home with a Week 17 win over the New York Jets in which they clinched a first-round bye, and wrapped up the regular season with an 11–5 record that was good enough to give them the AFC's second seed in the postseason. Despite their five losses, the team achieved the rare distinction of going unbeaten against teams that qualified for the playoffs.

The 2018 Patriots became the second team ever in the four major American sports leagues to win at least 10 straight division titles, joining Major League Baseball's Atlanta Braves (1991–2005, excluding the strike-shortened 1994 season). The Patriots also secured their 16th-straight 10-win season, tying the San Francisco 49ers' league record streak, set from 1983–98. Notable records set during the season include QB Tom Brady achieving the record for most career passing touchdowns (including playoffs).

In the playoffs, the Patriots defeated the Los Angeles Chargers in the Divisional round, 41–28, to advance to the AFC Championship game for a record eighth straight season. The Patriots defeated the Chiefs, 37–31 in overtime, to advance to the Super Bowl for a third straight year, becoming only the third team in NFL history to appear in three or more consecutive Super Bowls (joining the 1971–73 Miami Dolphins and 1990–93 Buffalo Bills).  In Super Bowl LIII, they faced the Los Angeles Rams in a rematch of Super Bowl XXXVI, in which the Patriots defeated the then-St. Louis Rams 20–17. The Patriots won the rematch as well by a score of 13–3 to win their sixth Super Bowl, tying the Pittsburgh Steelers for most Super Bowl championships in NFL history.

Offseason
On February 5, 2018, the Detroit Lions hired Patriots defensive coordinator Matt Patricia to serve as head coach.

On February 6, the Indianapolis Colts announced hiring Patriots offensive coordinator Josh McDaniels as their new head coach. The next day, McDaniels abruptly rejected the offer citing personal reasons, and decided to stay a part of the Patriots' organization. The controversy surrounding this decision led McDaniels' then-agent Bob LaMonte to terminate their professional relationship.

Roster changes

Free agents

Unrestricted

Restricted

Signings

Released/Waived

Retirements

Trades 
 On March 10, the Patriots traded their 2019 third-round selection to the Cleveland Browns for defensive tackle Danny Shelton and Cleveland's 2018 fifth-round selection (No. 159 overall).
 On March 15, the Patriots traded their 2018 sixth-round selection (No. 205) to the Cleveland Browns for cornerback Jason McCourty and Cleveland's 2018 seventh-round selection (No. 219 overall).
 On March 18, the Patriots traded their 2018 fifth-round selection (No. 159) to the Oakland Raiders for wide receiver Cordarrelle Patterson and a 2018 sixth-round selection (No. 210 overall).
 On April 3, the Patriots traded wide receiver Brandin Cooks and their 2018 fourth-round selection (No. 136) to the Los Angeles Rams for their first-round (No. 23) and sixth-round (No. 198) selections.
 On April 28, the Patriots traded their third-round selection (95th overall) to San Francisco in exchange for San Francisco's fifth-round selection (143rd overall) and offensive tackle Trent Brown.
On August 31, the Patriots traded safety Jordan Richards to the Atlanta Falcons for a 2020 conditional seventh-round pick.
On September 17, the Patriots traded a conditional fifth-round selection to the Cleveland Browns for wide receiver Josh Gordon.

Draft

Draft trades
The Patriots traded Brandin Cooks and their fourth-round selection (136th overall) to Los Angeles in exchange for their 23rd and sixth-round (No. 198) selections.
The Patriots traded quarterback Jimmy Garoppolo to San Francisco in exchange for San Francisco's second-round selection (43rd overall).
The Patriots traded their second-round selection (43rd overall) to Detroit in exchange for Detroit's second and fourth-round selections (51st and 117th overall).
The Patriots traded their second-round selection (51st overall) to Chicago in exchange for Chicago's fourth-round selection (105th overall) and their 2019 second-round selection.
The Patriots traded their second and fourth-round selections (63rd and 117th overall) to Tampa Bay in exchange for Tampa Bay's second-round selection (56th overall).
The Patriots traded their third-round selection (95th overall) to San Francisco in exchange for San Francisco's fifth-round selection (143rd overall) and offensive tackle Trent Brown.
The Patriots traded their fourth-round selection (105th overall) to Cleveland in exchange for Cleveland's fourth and sixth-round selections (114th and 178th overall).
The Patriots traded their fourth-round selection (114th overall) to Detroit in exchange for Detroit's 2019 third-round selection.
The Patriots traded their fourth-round selection (131st overall) to Philadelphia in exchange for cornerback Eric Rowe.
The Patriots traded the fifth-round selection they acquired from Cleveland (131st overall) to Oakland in exchange for Oakland's sixth-round selection (210th overall) and wide receiver Cordarrelle Patterson.
The Patriots traded their third-round selection in 2019 to Cleveland in exchange for Cleveland's fifth-round selection (159th overall) and defensive tackle Danny Shelton.
The Patriots traded their fifth- and seventh-round selections (168th and 270th overall) to Seattle in exchange for defensive end Cassius Marsh.
The Patriots traded their sixth-round selection (198th overall) to Kansas City in exchange for Kansas City's seventh-round selections (233rd and 243rd overall).
The Patriots traded their sixth-round selection (205th overall) to Cleveland in exchange for Cleveland's seventh-round selection (219th overall) and cornerback Jason McCourty.
The Patriots traded their seventh-round selection (233rd overall) to Philadelphia in exchange for Philadelphia's seventh-round selection (250th overall) and their 2019 seventh-round selection.
The Patriots traded their seventh-round selection (249th overall) to Cincinnati in exchange for linebacker Marquis Flowers.
The Patriots traded cornerback Justin Coleman to Seattle in exchange for Seattle's seventh-round selection they acquired from Philadelphia (250th overall).

Undrafted Free Agents

Suspensions
Wide receiver Julian Edelman was suspended for the first four games of the  season for violating the league's policy on performance-enhancing substances. Edelman, who missed the entire 2017 season due to a torn ACL suffered during the preseason, unsuccessfully appealed the suspension, and returned to the Patriots' roster for the team's Week 5 Thursday Night game vs. the Indianapolis Colts on October 4.

On December 20, 2018, Wide receiver Josh Gordon was suspended indefinitely for violating the terms of his reinstatement under the league's substance abuse policy. This is the second time Gordon was suspended indefinitely by the league.

Staff

Final roster

Preseason

Regular season

Schedule
The Patriots' schedule was announced on April 19.

Note: Intra-division opponents are in bold text.

Game summaries

Week 1: vs. Houston Texans

With the win, the Patriots started 1–0.

Week 2: at Jacksonville Jaguars

The Patriots faced the Jaguars in a rematch of the previous season's AFC Championship Game. The Patriots started off well, reaching Jaguars territory in just four plays, but the drive stalled, and Stephen Gostkowski missed a 54-yard field goal attempt. With great field position, the Jaguars raced 56 yards in 9 plays, scoring on a 4-yard touchdown pass from Blake Bortles to Donte Moncrief for the early lead. After a three-and-out, Patriots' punter Ryan Allen pinned the Jaguars back at their own 16-yard line. The Jaguars took the ball and cashed in, marching 84 yards on just 7 plays, with Bortles hitting Keelan Cole on a 24-yard touchdown pass, extending the Jags lead to 14–0. After stopping the Jaguars early in the second quarter, the Patriots drove 83 yards in over 8 minutes, but were forced to settle for a 29-yard field goal, trimming the deficit to 14–3. However, the Patriots defense was gashed again, with the Jags racing 75 yards, concluding with Bortles 4-yard touchdown pass to Austin Seferian-Jenkins and a 21–3 Jaguars lead with 0:09 seconds remaining in the half. The Jags started right where they left off, taking the opening drive of the second half all the way to the Patriots 10, but were held to a 28-yard field goal by Josh Lambo. After another Patriots punt, Bottles hit D. J. Chark for a 13-yard gain to the Jaguars 49, but Stephon Gilmore forced him to fumble with Duron Harmon recovering at the Jags 46. With the excellent field position, the Patriots finally reached the endzone with Brady finding Chris Hogan for a 7-yard touchdown pass to cap off the 46-yard drive, trimming the deficit to 24–10. After a Jaguars three-and-out, the Patriots drove all the way to the Jags 28, but settled for a 46-yard field goal, making the score just 24–13. Bortles made his only real mistake on the next drive, throwing an interception to Kyle Van Noy at the Jags 25 early in the fourth quarter. The Patriots were set up perfectly, it appeared to be a vintage Brady comeback, but on 3rd down, Dante Fowler stripped Brady and recovered the resultant fumble at the Jags 32. The Patriots forced a Jaguars punt and had another shot, but went three-and-out. On the next play from scrimmage for Jacksonville, Bottles hit Dede Westbrook for a 61-yard touchdown pass, extending the lead to 31–13. The Patriots marched 75 yards in 8 plays on their next drive with Brady connecting with Hogan again for a 29-yard touchdown pass, making the score 31–20; however, by now less than 4 minutes remained in the game. The Jags ran out the rest of the clock to win the game, their first ever regular season victory over the Pats, while the Patriots fell to 1–1.

Week 3: at Detroit Lions

After a Patriots three-and-out opened the game, the Lions marched 65 yards in 12 plays, taking over 7 minutes off the clock and facing only one 3rd down before settling for a 38-yard field goal by Matt Prater. After another Patriots three-and-out and set up with good field position, the Lions marched 60 yards in over 5 minutes to score on a 4-yard pass from Matthew Stafford to Kenny Golladay. Stafford completed all 5 pass attempts on the drive for 44 yards and the Lions didn't even face a 3rd down. The Patriots offense continued to appear lifeless with another three-and-out. Meanwhile, the Lions' efficiency shined again by slowly moving 71 yards, converting three 3rd downs and eating over seven more minutes off the clock, before settling for a 25-yard field goal, upping the Lions lead to 13–0. After 9 plays for 13 yards on their first three drives combined, the Patriots marched 57 yards to the Lions' 18, settling for a 36-yard field goal and trailed 13–3 at halftime. On 3rd down, just over a minute into the third quarter, Stafford was intercepted by linebacker Ja'Whaun Bentley at the Patriots 48. The Patriots look excellent on their next drive, racing 52 yards in just 7 plays with Brady hitting James White for a 10-yard touchdown, trimming the deficit to 13–10. The Lions continued their clock-draining game plan on their next drive, tracking 75 yards in over six minutes and converting three 3rd downs before Stafford bombed Marvin Jones Jr. for a 33-yard touchdown, pushing the score to 20–10 late in the 3rd quarter. After a Patriots' punt, the Lions drove all the way to the Patriots' 14, but settled for a 32-yard field goal, increasing their lead to 23–10 a few minutes into the fourth quarter. Two possessions later, from the Patriots' 43, Brady heaved a desperation pass that was intercepted by Darius Slay, who returned it 34 yards to the Lions' 49, but an illegal block penalty sent the ball back to the 19. After a Lions' punt, the Patriots turned the ball over on downs. The Lions closed out the scoring with a 30-yard field goal, making the final score 26–10. The Patriots drove to the Lions' 40, but the clock expired.

With the loss (their first to Detroit since the 2000 season), the Patriots fell to 1–2 for the first time since the 2012 season. The Lions were able to blanket the Patriots' receivers, stifling the Patriots' offense. The Lions had an excellent balanced attack with 159 yards rushing to go along with 255 yards passing from Stafford. The Patriots newest acquisition, superstar wide receiver Josh Gordon, was inactive for the game. Ironically, the Patriots' last loss to the Lions in 2000 was also Tom Brady's first ever NFL game, where he only appeared in the final seconds and completed one-of-three passes for 6 yards in a 34–9 loss.

Week 4: vs. Miami Dolphins

After taking the opening kickoff, a 22-yard pass from Ryan Tannehill to Kenny Stills helped the Dolphins reach midfield. On 2nd-and-7 from midfield, Dolphins offensive lineman Daniel Kilgore was flagged for holding, killing the drive, and the Dolphins punted. Starting at their own 24, the Patriots reached as far as the Dolphins 1-yard line, but were forced to settle for a 20-yard field goal and a 3–0 lead. After a Dolphins punt, the Patriots gave it right back when Brady was intercepted at the Dolphins 36 by Bobby McCain. The Dolphins went three-and-out, but the Patriots drove 67 yards to score on Brady's 55-yard touchdown pass to Cordarrelle Patterson, extending the Patriots lead to 10–0. Both teams punted on their next drive, but midway through the 2nd quarter, Tannehill fumbled the snap with Kyle Van Noy recovering for the Patriots at the Dolphins 22. On the very next play, James White scampered to the end zone on a 22-yard run, giving the Patriots a 17–0 lead which was their largest of the season to this point. The Dolphins offense continued to go in reverse on another three-and-out. The Patriots responded by converting four 3rd downs on a 15-play, 85-yard drive, scoring with Brady's 9-yard touchdown pass to wide receiver Phillip Dorsett to go up 24–0 with 0:17 seconds remaining in the first half. After both teams punted on their initial second-half possession, the Patriots marched 59 yards in just over five minutes, with Brady capping off another touchdown drive with his 14-yard touchdown pass to White, blowing the game open with a 31–0 lead. The Dolphins reached the Patriots 45 on their next possession, but Tannehill's desperation pass was intercepted at the 10-yard line by J. C. Jackson. The Patriots hot streak continued with a 12 play, 90-yard drive, scoring on a 12-yard touchdown run from rookie running back Sony Michel, his first career rushing touchdown. After yet another three-and-out from the Dolphins, the Patriots drove to the Dolphins 32, but Brady was intercepted at the Dolphins 14 by Minkah Fitzpatrick who returned it 11 yards to the Dolphins 25. With Tannehill pulled from the game, old Patriots' nemesis Brock Osweiler led the Dolphins 75 yards in 7:30, scoring on his 6-yard touchdown pass to Frank Gore, making the score 38–7 with less than three minutes remaining in the game. The Patriots ran the rest of the clock out to end the game. With the exception of the two turnovers, the Patriots dominated the Dolphins in every aspect of the game, outgaining them 446–172 and holding the ball for 14 minutes longer. Tom Brady threw for 274 yards, three touchdowns and two interceptions. Michel had his best game of the season to date with 25 carries for 112 yards and a touchdown. White had the best day overall with 16 touches for 112 total yards from scrimmage and two touchdowns. The Patriots avoided a 3-game losing streak for the first time since 2002 or a 1–3 start for the first time since their 2001 Super Bowl-winning season.

Week 5: vs. Indianapolis Colts

The Patriots faced the Colts on Thursday Night Football, with Brady hoping to remain undefeated against Andrew Luck.

The Patriots took the opening kickoff and marched 75 yards in over 6 minutes, scoring on a 1-yard touchdown pass from Tom Brady to Cordarrelle Patterson for the early lead. The next possession ended in a punt for both teams, but on the Colts' second possession, they drove from their own 6 to the Patriots 20, but ageless wonder Adam Vinatieri missed a 38-yard field goal attempt off the left upright. The Patriots took advantage off the missed opportunity and raced 72 yards to score on Brady's 1-yard touchdown run, extending the Patriots' lead to 14–0 early in the second quarter. The Colts drove to the Patriots 36 on their next drive and Vinatieri redeemed himself with a 54-yard field goal. After both teams punted on their resultant drive, the Patriots raced 68 yards to score on a 6-yard touchdown pass from Brady to James White for a 21–3 lead. Following this, Luck was intercepted at the Patriots 49 by Patrick Chung who returned it 2 yards to the 49 of the Colts with less than a minute remaining in the first half. With the excellent field position, the Patriots reached the Colts' 27 and took a commanding 24–3 lead into halftime after a 45-yard field goal from placekicker Stephen Gostkowski. Early in the third quarter, Chester Rogers returned a punt from Ryan Allen 33 yards to Patriots 35. It took the Colts just 4 plays to score on a 14-yard pass from Luck to Eric Ebron, trimming the deficit to 24–10. The Patriots drove to the Colts 30 on their next drive, but Matthias Farley intercepted Brady's pass at the 23 and returned it 7 yards to the Colts' 30. But four plays later, Jordan Wilkins fumbled after a 9-yard catch with Devin McCourty recovering for the Patriots at midfield. The Patriots drove to the Colts' 25, but the turnover streak continued when Brady was intercepted at the Colts' 4 by Najee Goode who returned it 16 yards to the Colts' 20. The Colts proceeded to drive 80 yards in 10 plays with Luck finding Erik Swoope for a 13-yard touchdown pass, trimming the Patriots' lead to a thin 24–17 early in the fourth quarter. However, any hope for a Colts comeback died when the Patriots marched 75 yards to score on a 34-yard touchdown bomb from Brady to Josh Gordon, widening the Patriots lead to 31–17. Any chance of a miraculous comeback died on the Colts' next drive when Luck was intercepted at the Patriots 38 by Jonathan Jones who returned it 28 yards to the Colts' 34. On the very next play, Sony Michel scored on a 34-yard touchdown burst, putting the game out of reach with a 38–17 Patriots lead. The Colts turned the ball over on downs on their next drive, but after forcing the Patriots to punt, marched 60 yards to score on Luck's 1-yard touchdown pass to Ebron. The Patriots ran out the rest of the clock to win the game 38–24.

Tom Brady completed 34/44 passes for 341 yards and 3 TDs but threw 2 interceptions while Michel ran the ball 18 times for 98 yards and a touchdown. Andrew Luck threw for 365 yards and 3 TDs but threw 2 costly interceptions.

Week 6: vs. Kansas City Chiefs

With the win, the Patriots improved to 4–2.

Week 7: at Chicago Bears

With the win, the Patriots improved to 5–2.

Week 8: at Buffalo Bills

With the win, the Patriots improved to 6–2. Devin McCourty's interception return marked the first defensive touchdown for the Patriots since the 2015 season, breaking a league-leading 40-game drought.

Week 9: vs. Green Bay Packers

Rematch between Aaron Rodgers and Tom Brady. With the win, the Patriots improved to 7–2. This was the first game of the season where the Patriots defense did not record an interception, after recording at least one in each of their first eight games.

Week 10: at Tennessee Titans

This was the Pats' first loss to Tennessee in 16 years; coincidentally, it was also at Nissan Stadium (then known as Adelphia Coliseum). The blowout loss ended the Pats' six-game winning streak as they fell to 7–3. It was also the Pats’ first time meeting with former players Malcolm Butler and Dion Lewis since leaving the Pats to join the Titans in free agency.

Week 12: at New York Jets

With the win, the Patriots improved to 8–3.

Week 13: vs. Minnesota Vikings

With the win, the Patriots improved to 9–3.

Week 14: at Miami Dolphins

The Patriots lost to the Dolphins on a last second lateral at the end of regulation. With the heartbreaking loss, the Patriots fell to 9–4 for the first time since 2006.

Week 15: at Pittsburgh Steelers

This was the Pats' first loss to Pittsburgh for the first time since 2011 with a final score of 10–17. With the loss, the Patriots fell to 9–5 for the first time since 2008.

Week 16: vs. Buffalo Bills

After receiver Josh Gordon left the team and was later suspended, the Patriots relied on their run game and defense against Buffalo. The Pats clinched their 10th straight AFC East title with the win (though in the event of a loss to Buffalo, Miami's loss to Jacksonville also would've clinched the division for New England), improving their record to 10–5, and for the second time this season, denied a 3-game losing streak for the first time since 2002. With the Houston Texans' loss to the Philadelphia Eagles, the Patriots moved to the #2 seed in the AFC, and would have the chance to secure a playoff bye with a win in the following week's game. Tom Brady eclipsed 4,000 yards at the same time as Philip Rivers, becoming the third and fourth quarterback in NFL history to reach 4,000 yards in 10 seasons or more, joining Peyton Manning & Drew Brees.

Week 17: vs. New York Jets

The Pats finish the 2018 season undefeated at home, and an 11–5 record overall, their first in 10 years and with the win, the Patriots clinched a 1st round bye for the 9th straight year.

Standings

Division

Conference

Postseason

Schedule

Game summaries

AFC Divisional Playoffs: vs. (5) Los Angeles Chargers

AFC Championship: at (1) Kansas City Chiefs

Super Bowl LIII: vs. (N2) Los Angeles Rams

References

External links
 

New England Patriots
New England Patriots seasons
New England Patriots
AFC East championship seasons
American Football Conference championship seasons
Super Bowl champion seasons
Sports competitions in Foxborough, Massachusetts